Princely abbeys (Fürststift) and Imperial abbeys (Reichskloster, Reichsstift, Reichsgotthaus) were religious establishments within the Holy Roman Empire which enjoyed the status of imperial immediacy (Reichsunmittelbarkeit) and therefore were answerable directly to the Emperor. The possession of imperial immediacy came with a unique form of territorial authority known as Landeshoheit, which carried with it nearly all the attributes of sovereignty.

Princely abbeys and imperial abbeys

The distinction between a princely abbey and an imperial abbey was related to the status of the abbot: while both prince-abbots and the more numerous imperial abbots sat on the ecclesiastical bench of the College of ruling princes of the Imperial Diet, prince-abbots cast an individual vote while imperial abbots cast only a curial (collective) vote alongside his or her fellow imperial abbots and abbesses. Eight princely abbeys (including similar status priories) and roughly 40 imperial abbeys survived up to the mass secularisation of 1802–03 when they were all secularized.

The head of an Imperial abbey was generally an Imperial abbot (Reichsabt) or Imperial abbess (Reichsäbtissin). (The head of a Reichspropstei—an Imperial provostry or priory—was generally a Reichspropst). Collectively, Imperial abbots, provosts and priors were formally known as Reichsprälaten (Imperial Prelates). A small number of the larger and most prestigious establishments had the rank of princely abbeys (Fürstsabtei), and were headed by a prince-abbot or a prince-provost (Fürstabt, Fürstpropst), with status comparable to that of Prince-Bishops. Most however were imperial prelates and as such participated in a single collective vote in the Imperial Diet as members of the Bench of Prelates, later (1575) divided into the Swabian College of Imperial Prelates and the Rhenish College of Imperial Prelates. Despite their difference of status within the Imperial Diet, both the Imperial Prelates and the Prince-Abbots exercised the same degree of authority over their principality.

Some abbeys, particularly in Switzerland, gained the status of princely abbeys (Fürstsabtei) during the Middle Ages or later but they either didn't have a territory over which they ruled or they lost that territory after a short while. This was the case with Kreuzlingen, Allerheiligen, Einsiedeln, Muri and Saint-Maurice abbeys. One major exception was the large and powerful Abbey of St. Gall which remained independent up to its dissolution during the Napoleonic period, despite the fact that, as a Swiss abbey, it had stopped taking part in  the Imperial Diet and other institutions of the Holy Roman Empire once the independence of the Swiss Confederacy was recognized in 1648. Elsewhere, the Prince-Abbot of St. Blaise's Abbey in the Black Forest held that title, not on account of the status of the abbey, which was not immediate, but because it was conferred on him by the abbey's ownership of the immediate County of Bonndorf (later annexed to the Principality of Heitersheim of the Knights of Malta).

Lists of Imperial abbeys

List of Imperial abbeys with seat and voice at the Imperial Diet of 1792
The following list includes the Imperial abbeys which had seat and voice at the Imperial Diet of 1792. They, along with the two Teutonic Order commanderies whose commanders ranked as prelates, are listed according to their voting order on the two Benches of Prelates of the Diet. Not shown are the abbeys of Stablo, Kempten and Corvey, whose abbots had princely status and sat on the Ecclesiastical Bench of the College of Ruling Princes. For additional information on individual abbeys, see: List A: Imperial abbeys named in the Matrikel below this list.

Bench of Swabian Prelates

Bench of Rhineland Prelates

List A: Imperial abbeys named in the Matrikel 
The religious houses listed here as List A are those named in the Matrikel, or lists of those eligible to vote in the Imperial Diet, including those whose votes were collective rather than individual. Three of these lists survive and are accessible, from 1521, 1755 (or thereabouts) and 1792.

This list includes the Principalities, Imperial abbeys (Reichsabteien and -klöster), Imperial colleges (Reichsstifte), Imperial provostries or priories (Reichspropsteien) and the single Imperial charterhouse (Reichskartause).

The word "Stift", meaning a collegiate foundation or canonry, possibly belonging to a variety of different orders or to none at all, and either with or without rules and vows, for either men ("Herrenstift") or for women (Frauenstift), has been left untranslated, except when it specifically refers to the chapter of a church.

Some of the imperial abbeys were dissolved during the Reformation; others were absorbed into other territories at various times in the general course of political life. Those in Alsace and Switzerland passed out of the Empire in 1648, when Alsace was ceded to France and Switzerland became independent. The great majority of these religious bodies however were secularized during the brief period that included the French Revolution, the Napoleonic Wars, and their aftermath, especially as a result of the German mediatization (Reichsdeputationshauptschluss) of February 1803. Any that survived lost their Imperial status when the Holy Roman Empire was wound up in 1806.

Abbreviations 
 Description and Imperial status column:
 RA stands for Reichsabtei (Imperial abbey)
 RF stands for "Reichsfürstentum" (Imperial Principality)
 RP stands for "Reichspropstei" (Imperial provostry)
 Lost imm. column:
 imm. Imperial immediacy
 Sec. secularised
 Med. mediatised
 Switz. Switzerland
 Hel. Helvetic Republic
 College column:
 RC stands for "Rhenish College"
 SC stands for "Swabian College"
 RF stands for "Reichsfürst", i.e., the head of the house in question had an individual seat and voice in the Imperial Diet; there were ten of these (Fulda, Kempten, Ellwangen, Murbach-Lüders, Berchtesgaden, Weissenburg, Prüm, Stablo-Malmedy, Corvey and St. Gall).

List B: Reichsmatrikel 1521
The Matrikel of 1521 included a number of religious houses which have not been identified:

Inclusion in the 1521 Reichsmatrikel is not by itself conclusive evidence that a particular religious house was in fact an Imperial abbey, and the status of the following abbey listed in the Matrikel is questionable in the absence of further confirmation from other sources:

List C: Imperial abbeys not named in the Matrikel
For a variety of reasons a quantity of religious houses that possessed, or claimed, the status of Imperial immediacy either did not attend the Imperial Diet, or were not listed in the surviving Matrikel. The following list is very far from complete, and possibly some of those listed may not in fact have been immediate (reichsunmittelbar).

References and notes

Bibliography
In German:
 Matthäi, George, 1877: Die Klosterpolitik Kaiser Heinrichs II. Ein Beitrag zur *Geschichte der Reichsabteien. Grünberg i.Schl.
 Brennich, Max, 1908: Die Besetzung der Reichsabteien in den Jahren 1138–1209. Greifswald.
 Polzin, Johannes: Die Abtswahlen in den Reichsabteien von 1024–1056.
 Riese, Heinrich, 1911: Die Besetzung der Reichsabteien in den Jahren 1056–1137.
 Feierabend, Hans, 1913, repr. 1971: Die politische Stellung der deutschen Reichsabteien während des Investiturstreites. Breslau 1913; Aalen 1971
 Wehlt, Hans-Peter, 1970: Reichsabtei und König
 Vogtherr, Thomas, 2000: Die Reichsabteien der Benediktiner und das Königtum im hohen Mittelalter (900–1125) (Mittelalter-Forschungen, vol. 5)

External links
 Reichstag participants 1521, c. 1755 and 1792, on Heraldica website 
 1521 Reichsmatrikel 
 Sarah Hadry: Reichsstifte [Imperial Abbeys]. In: Historisches Lexikon Bayerns. Onlineversion
 Sarah Hadry: Reichsprälatenkollegium [Council of Imperial Abbeys]. In: Historisches Lexikon Bayerns. Onlineversion

Imperial abbeys
Abbeys
 
 
 
 
 
 
 
History of Swabia
Former enclaves